Ralph is a masculine given name and a surname. It may also refer to:

Places in the United States
Ralph, South Dakota, an unincorporated community
Ralph, West Virginia, an unincorporated community

Other uses
 Ralph (magazine), Australian magazine published 1997–2010
 Ralph, a female Canadian pop singer
 Ralph Records, original record label of The Residents (1972–1987)
 Ralphs, American supermarket chain
 Ralph (New Horizons), a photographic instrument on board the robotic spacecraft New Horizons used to image Pluto
 Ralphing, vomiting